The Bol d'Or was a bicycle track race that ran in France between 1894 and 1950. It was a paced, 24-hour endurance event. It has been won by several notable cyclists including Constant Huret (4 times), the Australian Hubert Opperman and three time hour record breaker Oscar Egg. The person with the most wins is Léon Georget (brother of Émile) with nine (including eight in a row).

Origins
In the nineteenth century, English and French cyclists were trying to get the world record for 24 hours cycling. Usually, the English cyclists had the record, but in 1892 a French cyclist (Auguste Stéphane) broke the record, riding 631 km. The English cyclists organized a cycling event a few days later, and in that race they took back the record when Frank Shorland rode 665 km. The record changed hands a few more times during irregularly scheduled competitions, but in 1894 the French created the Bol d'Or so they would have a yearly go at the record.

The race was created on 23 and 24 June 1894 by a Monsieur Decam. It first ran at the Vélodrome Buffalo in Paris and was sponsored by Chocolate Meunier.

The race gets its name from the prize awarded to the winner - a gilded bronze bowl or cup.

Rules
During the Bol d'Or, riders had 24 hours to ride as many laps as possible. The riders were helped by pacers; details of the pacing changed over the years. In 1899, electric tandems were tried, which resulted in a record distance. In 1902, riders were only paced in the first two and last two hours, which resulted in a lower distance.

In the early years riders were paced by tandems or triplets. Motor (derny) pacing was used in 1950. The 1900 event was one of the cycling events during the 1900 Summer Olympics, but it is not considered an Olympic event by the IOC because professional cyclists were allowed to enter.

Winners

External links
Bol d'Or at memoire-du-cyclisme.eu

References

Track cycling races
Cycle races in France
Defunct cycling races in France
Sports competitions in Paris
Recurring sporting events established in 1894
1894 establishments in France
Recurring sporting events disestablished in 1950
1950 disestablishments in France